The Gulf of Oman or Sea of Oman ( khalīj ʿumān;  daryâ-ye omân), also known as Gulf of Makran or Sea of Makran ( khalīj makrān;  daryâ-ye makrān), is a gulf that connects the Arabian Sea with the Strait of Hormuz, which then runs to the Persian Gulf. It borders Iran and Pakistan on the north, Oman on the south, and the United Arab Emirates on the west.

Extent
The International Hydrographic Organization defines the limits of the Gulf of Oman as follows:

Exclusive economic zone
Exclusive economic zones in Persian Gulf:

Bordering countries
Coastline length of bordering countries:

  - 850 km coastline
  - 750 km coastline
  - 50 km coastline
  - 50 km coastline

Alternative names

The Gulf of Oman historically and geographically has been referred to with different names by Arabian, Iranian, Indian, Pakistani and European geographers and travelers, including Makran Sea and Akhzar Sea.

 Makran Sea
 Akhzar Sea
 Persian Sea (Consist of whole of Persian gulf and gulf of Oman)

Until the 18th century it was known as Makran Sea and is also visible on historical maps and museums.

Major ports
Port of Fujairah, Fujairah, United Arab Emirates
Khor Fakkan Container Terminal, Khor Fakkan, United Arab Emirates
Port of Chabahar, Chabahar, Iran
Port Sultan Qaboos, Muttrah, Oman

International trade 
The Western side of the gulf connects to the Strait of Hormuz, a strategic route through which a third of the world's liquefied natural gas and 20% of global oil consumption passes from Middle East producers.

Ecology

In 2018, scientists confirmed the Gulf of Oman contains one of the world's largest marine dead zones, where the ocean contains little or no oxygen and marine wildlife cannot exist. The dead zone encompasses nearly the entire  Gulf of Oman, equivalent to the size of Florida, United States of America. The cause is a combination of increased ocean warming and increased runoff of nitrogen and phosphorus from fertilizers.

International underwater rail tunnel
In 2018, a rail tunnel under the sea was suggested to link the UAE with the western coast of India.

Pop culture 
In the Battlefield video game series, the Gulf of Oman is a map used in Battlefield 2, Battlefield 3, Battlefield Play4Free and Battlefield 4 with the United States Marines Corps (USMC) invading the shore of Oman with the fictional Middle Eastern Coalition (MEC) defending it in Battlefield 2, and with Russian Ground Forces defending it in Play4Free, Battlefield 3 and Battlefield 4.

See also
 Strait of Hormuz
 Persian Gulf
 Eastern Arabia
 Musandam Peninsula
 History of the United Arab Emirates#The pearling industry and the Portuguese empire: 16th - 18th century
 Saeed bin Butti#Perpetual Maritime Truce
 Trucial States
 Sultan bin Saqr Al Qasimi#Perpetual Maritime Truce of 1853
 Persian Gulf campaign of 1809
 Persian Gulf campaign of 1819
 General Maritime Treaty of 1820
 May 2019 Gulf of Oman incident
 June 2019 Gulf of Oman incident
 Geography of Oman
 Geography of Iran
 Geography of United Arab Emirates
 Geography of Pakistan

References

Further reading 
 "The Book of Duarte Barbosa" by Duarte Barbosa, Mansel Longworth Dames. 1989. p. 79. 
 "The Natural History of Pliny". by Pliny, Henry Thomas Riley, John Bostock. 1855. p. 117
 "The Countries and Tribes of the Persian Gulf" by Samuel Barrett Miles - 1966. p. 148
 "The Life & Strange Surprising Adventures of Robinson Crusoe of York, Mariner". by Daniel Defoe. 1895. p. 279
 "The Outline of History: Being a Plain History of Life and Mankind". by Herbert George Well. 1920. p. 379.
 "The New Schaff-Herzog Encyclopedia of Religious Knowledge" by Johann Jakob Herzog, Philip Schaff, Albert Hauck. 1910. p. 242

 
Gulfs of Iran
Seas of Iran
Bodies of water of Iran
Oman
Bodies of water of Pakistan
Bodies of water of Oman
Bodies of water of the United Arab Emirates
Oman
Bodies of water of the Arabian Sea
Iran–Pakistan border
Oman–United Arab Emirates border
Western Indo-Pacific